Nationality words link to articles with information on the nation's poetry or literature (for instance, Irish or France).

Events
Commissioned with other Hungarian poets to write a poem of praise for a visit of Franz Joseph I of Austria to his country, János Arany instead produces the subversive ballad The Bards of Wales (A walesi bárdok), unpublished until 1863.

Works published in English

United Kingdom
 Elizabeth Barrett Browning, Aurora Leigh, dated this year but first published at the end of 1856
 Edward Bulwer-Lytton, writing under the pen name "Owen Meredith", The Wanderer
 Elizabeth Gaskell, The Life of Charlotte Brontë, Smith, Elder & Co., biography
 Frederick Locker, London Lyrics (12 re-editions to 1893)
 Denis MacCarthy, Underglimpses, and Other Poems
 Theodore Martin, translated from Adam Oehlenschlager, Aladdin; or, The Wonderful Lamp

United States
 William Allen Butler, Nothing to Wear, published posthumously (first published anonymously in Harper's Weekly); the poem sold well, despite the financial panic; when a woman declared she was the author, the resulting controversy helped sales (see Mortimer Thomson's poem describing the controversy, below)
 Paul Hamilton Hayne, Sonnets and Other Poems
 Francis Scott Key, Poems
 James Lawson, Poems
 Alexander Beaufort Meek, Songs and Poems of the South
 Mortimer Thomson, writing under the pen name "Q. K. Philander Doesticks, P. B." (Without the pen name's abbreviations: "Queer Kritter Philander Doesticks, Perfect Brick"), Nothing to Say: A Slight Slap at Mobocratic Snobbery, Which Has "Nothing to Do" with "Nothing to Wear" on the controversy over the authorship of William Allen Butler's poem Nothing to Wear; Thomson was offered a dollar a line for a poem on the subject, submitted an 800-line poem and was paid in full; illustrated by John McLenan; the book sold well
 Richard Henry Stoddard, Songs of Summer
 John Greenleaf Whittier:
 The Sycamores
 The Poetical Works of John Greenleaf Whittier

Other in English
 Charles Heavysege, Saul: A Drama in Three Parts, first edition (second edition, 1869); Canada
 James Lionel Michael, Songs without Music, lyrics, Australia

Works published in other languages

 Théodore de Banville, France
 Charles Baudelaire, Les Fleurs du mal ("Flowers of Evil"), France
 Giosuè Carducci, Italy
 Rosalia de Castro, Galician Spanish poet, writing in Spanish
 Friedrich Reinhold Kreutzwald, Kalevipoeg, Estonia, revised version begins first publication
 Jan Neruda,  ("Cemetery Flowers"), Czech

Births
Death years link to the corresponding "[year] in poetry" article:
 February 27 – Agnes Mary Frances Duclaux, née Robinson (died 1944), English-born poet and biographer
 March 17 – Benjamin Franklin King, Jr. (died 1894), American poet
 April 11 – John Davidson (died 1909), Scottish poet and playwright
 April 17 – Jane Barlow (died 1917), Irish poet and novelist
 June 13 – Hubert Church (died 1932), Australian poet
 September 22 – James Hebblethwaite (died 1921), Australian poet and clergyman
 Undated – Kaikobad (কায়কোবাদ) (also spelt "Kaykobad" and also known as Mohakobi Kaikobad ("Kaikobad the great poet"), pen name of Kazem Al Quereshi (died 1951), Bengali poet

Deaths
Birth years link to the corresponding "[year] in poetry" article:
 February 9 – Dionysios Solomos Διονύσιος Σολωμός (born 1798), Greek poet best known for the Hymn to Liberty,  the first two stanzas  of which became the Greek national anthem
 March 11 – Manuel José Quintana (born 1772), Spanish
 April 11 – John Davidson (died 1909), Scottish poet and playwright
 May 2 – Alfred de Musset (born 1810), French poet and novelist
 June 25 – Isabella Kelly (born 1759), Scottish-born novelist and poet
 October 14 – Alexander Laing (born 1787), Scottish poet
 November 26 – Joseph von Eichendorff (born 1788), German poet and novelist
 December 13 – Richard Furness, "The Poet of Eyam" (born 1791), English
 Undated – Anna Ehrenström (born 1786), Swedish poet

See also

 19th century in poetry
 19th century in literature
 List of years in poetry
 List of years in literature
 Victorian literature
 French literature of the 19th century
 Poetry

Notes

19th-century poetry
Poetry